, short for "Digital Monsters" ( Dejitaru Monsutā), is a Japanese media franchise encompassing virtual pet toys, anime, manga, video games, films and a trading card game. The franchise focuses on the eponymous creatures, who inhabit a "Digital World", a parallel universe that originated from Earth's various communication networks.

The franchise was created in 1997 as a series of virtual pets, intended as the masculine counterpart to Tamagotchi. The creatures were first designed to look cute and iconic even on the devices' small screens; later developments had them created with a harder-edged style influenced by American comics. The franchise gained momentum with an early video game, Digimon World, released only in Japan in January 1999. Several anime series and films including its first anime incarnation, Digimon Adventure, which based on both video game and digital pet have been released, and the video game series has expanded into genres such as role-playing, racing, fighting, and MMORPGs.

Conception and creation

The Digimon franchise began as a series of virtual pets created by WiZ and Bandai, intended as a masculine counterpart to the more female-oriented Tamagotchi pets. It was released in June 1997 with the name Digimon, short for Digital Monster. This device shows to players a virtual pet composed entirely of data and designed to play and fight. In February 1998, the DigiMon fighting game, compatible with Windows 95 and developed by Rapture Technologies, Inc., was announced. The one-shot manga C'mon Digimon, designed by Tenya Yabuno, was published in the Japanese magazine V-Jump by Shueisha in 1997.

A second generation of virtual pets was marketed six months after the launch of the first, followed by a third in 1998. Each player starts with a baby-level digital creature that has a limited number of attacks and transformations and to make the creature stronger by training and nourishing the creature; when the player is successful in a workout, the Digimon becomes strong, when the player fails, the Digimon becomes weak. Two devices can be connected, allowing two players to battle with their respective creatures, an innovation at the time, however, the battle is only possible from the moment the creature is in the child level or bigger. Playgrounds and subways were where the majority of users of the apparatus were concentrated; The virtual pet was banned in some Asian schools by being considered by parents and teachers as very noisy and violent. The first Digimon were created by Japanese designer Kenji Watanabe, influenced by American comics, which were beginning to gain popularity in Japan, and as such began to make his characters look stronger and "cool." Other types of Digimon, which until the year 2000 totalled 279, came from extensive discussions and collaborations between the Bandai company members.

The original Digital Monster model that was released in 1997 sold  units worldwide, including  million units in Japan and  million overseas, up until March 2004. By 2005, more than  Digital Monster units had been sold worldwide.

Premise

Though most works in the franchise are contained within their own continuity, they all share basic setting and lore elements. Most Digimon stories begin with a human child coming into contact with a Digimon, either through accidentally entering the Digital World  or encountering a Digimon who has come into the human world. The child or children will find themselves equipped with a "digivice", a device modelled after the series' virtual pets that enables them to empower their partner Digimon.

While some digimon act like wild beasts, many form small societies and follow governing bodies such as the Royal Knights or Digimon Sovereign. Digimon can grow through evolution (or "digivolution" in most English-language dubs) by absorbing additional data and changing forms; the process is normally linear but there are other methods. For example, "Jogress" (a portmanteau of "joint progress"; "DNA Digivolution" in most English-language dubs) is when two or more Digimon combine into a single being. Though evolution can occur naturally, Digimon can progress faster and into stronger forms when partnered with a human.

Anime

Television series 
Multiple Digimon anime series have been produced by Toei Animation since 1999. The first of these was Digimon Adventure; it began as a short film, but after its storyboard was finished, a request for the film to become a television series was made. The film debuted in theaters a day before the series debuted on TV.

The first six Digimon series were adapted into English for release in Western markets, with the first four treated as a single show under the collective title Digimon: Digital Monsters. The sixth series, Digimon Fusion, was only partially localized; its third season was never adapted into English.

Overview

Films

Several Digimon featurette films were released in Japan, with some of them seasonal tie-ins for their respective television series. Footage from the first three films was used for the American-produced Digimon: The Movie.

OVA

Distribution and localization
In the United States, the first three series that made up Digimon: Digital Monsters first aired on Fox Kids from August 14, 1999 to June 8, 2002. The localized series was produced by Saban Entertainment, which would be acquired by The Walt Disney Company during the show's Fox Kids run. Some scenes from the original shows were modified or omitted in order to comply with Fox's standards and practices. The show also featured more jokes and added dialogue, along with a completely different musical score. As a cross-promotional stunt, 2001 and 2002 saw Digi-Bowl specials co-produced with Fox Sports; NFL on Fox commentator Terry Bradshaw provided interstitial segments in-between episodes as if the episodes were actually a football game.

Disney's acquisition of Saban would result in Digimon airing on Disney's TV networks and programming blocks. Reruns of the show would begin airing on the cable network ABC Family on March 4, 2002, while the fourth series, Digimon Frontier, premiered on UPN's Disney's One Too block. UPN aired the series until late August 2003, when they severed their ties to Disney. Frontier would also air in reruns on ABC Family and on Toon Disney under the Jetix branding. An English version of Digimon Data Squad, produced by Studiopolis, would premiere October 1, 2007, on Toon Disney. Around this time, the remaining Digimon Adventure 02 movie, both Tamers movies and the Frontier movie would also be dubbed and aired on Toon Disney in the US, with most actors from the TV series reprising their roles. The Data Squad/Savers movie however would not get a North American localised English dub produced.

In September 2012, Saban Brands, a successor to Saban Entertainment, announced it had acquired the Digimon anime franchise. Saban would announce that they would be producing an English dub for Digimon Xros Wars, retitled Digimon Fusion, for broadcast on Nickelodeon in the United States starting September 7, 2013. Saban Capital Group would later sell most of Saban Brands' entertainment properties to Hasbro in 2018 and shutter the division in July of that year.

The Digimon Adventure tri. series would be distributed in North America by Eleven Arts. The English dub would utilize localized names from Saban's original dub, reunite several voice actors from the original cast, and feature a remixed version of the English opening theme, while retaining the original Japanese score. Shout! Factory would acquire the broadcast and home media distribution rights for the films.

International
In Canada, the English versions of Digimon were broadcast on YTV, with the exception of Data Squad, which aired in Family Channel's Jetix block. YTV would eventually acquire Digimon Fusion, but only the first 26 episodes were shown.

In the United Kingdom, Digimon first aired on Fox Kids. ITV's children's slot CITV would broadcast Adventure, Adventure 02 and several episodes of Tamers during after school hours from 2001–2002. The rest of Tamers aired on Fox Kids from 2002–03. Digimon Frontier was originally announced to be broadcast on Jetix, but the series was later dropped. The series eventually saw a release on October 29, 2018. In 2011, Digimon Data Squad aired on Kix!. 
According to Fox Kids' (2000–03) and Kix's (2010–) BARB Television ratings, Adventure, Adventure 02 & Tamers have been the most popular series'/seasons in the United Kingdom and was consistently in the weekly top 10 broadcasts for both channels for new episodes. Broadcast rights and merchandising sub-licensing rights for Digimon Fusion in the UK have been acquired by ITV Studios Global Entertainment. Digimon Fusion had aired since Spring 2014 on digital terrestrial channel, CITV.

In the Philippines, Digimon was first aired on ABS-CBN in Filipino English language from June 2, 2000 to October 21, 2001. And later, it was shift to Filipino in April 6, 2002.

Manga
Digimon first appeared in narrative form in the one-shot manga C'mon Digimon, released in the summer of 1997. C'mon Digimon spawned the popular Digimon Adventure V-Tamer 01 manga, written by Hiroshi Izawa, which began serialization on November 21, 1998.

 C'mon Digimon
 Digimon Adventure V-Tamer 01
 Digimon Chronicle
 Digimon Next
 Digimon Xros Wars
 Digimon World Re:Digitize
 Digimon World Re:Digitize Decode
 Digimon Story: Cyber Sleuth
 Digimon Story: Cyber Sleuth – Hacker's Memory
 Digimon Chronicle X
 Digimon Dreamers

Yuen Wong Yu manhua
This adaptation covers Digimon Adventure in five volumes, Digimon Adventure 02 in two, Digimon Tamers in four, and Digimon Frontier in three. The original stories are heavily abridged, though on rare occasions events play out differently from the anime. The Chinese-language version was published by Rightman Publishing Ltd. in Hong Kong. Yu also wrote D-Cyber.

Two English versions were also released. The first one was published by Chuang Yi in Singapore. The second one, which was adapted by Lianne Sentar, was released by TOKYOPOP in North America.The three volumes for Digimon Frontier have been released by Chuang Yi in English. These have not been released by TOKYOPOP in North America or Europe. However, the Chuang Yi releases of Digimon Frontier were distributed by Madman Entertainment in Australia.

Dark Horse

Dark Horse Comics published American-style Digimon comic books, adapting the first thirteen episodes of the English dub of Digimon Adventure in 2001. The story was written by Daniel Horn and Ryan Hill, and illustrated by Daniel Horn and Cara L. Niece.

Panini
The Italian publishing company, Panini, approached Digimon in different ways in different countries. While Germany created their own adaptations of episodes, the United Kingdom (UK) reprinted the Dark Horse titles, then translated some of the German adaptations of Adventure 02 episodes. Eventually the UK comics were given their own original stories, which appeared in both the UK's official Digimon Magazine and the official UK Fox Kids companion magazine, Wickid. These original stories only roughly followed the continuity of Adventure 02. When the comic switched to the Tamers series the storylines adhered to continuity more strictly; sometimes it would expand on subject matter not covered by the original Japanese anime (such as Mitsuo Yamaki's past) or the English adaptations of the television shows and movies (such as Ryo's story or the movies that remained undubbed until 2005). In a money saving venture, the original stories were later removed from Digimon Magazine, which returned to printing translated German adaptations of Tamers episodes. Eventually, both magazines were cancelled.

Video games

The Digimon series has inspired various video games, including the Digimon World and Digimon Story sub-series of role-playing games. Other genres have included life simulation, adventure, video card game, strategy, and racing games.

By March 2001, Bandai had sold approximately  video games worldwide, including 400,000 in Japan. In February 2010, a website for the MMORPG Digimon Battle Online was launched. On September 22, 2011, online game publisher Joymax announced the release of an MMORPG game called Digimon Masters, which was developed by the Korean publisher DIGITALIC. In June 2021 it was announced that they were developing a new MMORPG titled Digimon Super Rumble.

In 2011, a new entry in the Digimon World series was announced after a seven-year hiatus, titled Digimon World Re:Digitize. The game would be released in Japan on July 19, 2012, followed by an enhanced version for Nintendo 3DS released in 2013.

Digimon Story: Cyber Sleuth was first released in Japan in 2015. It would be the first game in the Digimon Story series to be released in North America under its original title; Digimon World DS and Digimon World Dawn and Dusk were originally marketed as entries in the Digimon World series, with the latter game being the last to be released in the West for nine years until Cyber Sleuth'''s release on February 2, 2016.

There have also been several mobile games. Digimon Links was active from March 2016 to July 2019, and was similar to the Story games in that the player raised digimon in a farm and fought enemies using team of three of their digimon. It was succeeded by Digimon ReArise, which launched June 2018 in Japan and October 2019 in America.

Web novel
On February 2023, Bandai announced a web novel titled Digimon Seekers to celebrate the 25th anniversary of the franchise. The novel will serialize on the Digimon Web website for about a year, starting on April 3, simultaneously in English, Chinese, and Japanese.

Card game

The Digimon Collectible Card Game is a card game based on Digimon, first introduced in Japan in 1997 and published by Bandai. The third season (Digimon Tamers) utilized this aspect of the franchise by making the card game an integral part of the season. Versions of the card game are also included in some of the Digimon video games including Digital Card Battle and Digimon World 3.

During the fourth anime (Digimon Frontier), Bandai created the D-Tector Card Game to tie in to their own D-Tector virtual pet toys. This was a West-only card game. From February 25, 2011 to September 28, 2012, Digimon Jintrix was an online card game supported by physical card releases. It was followed up by the mobile game Digimon Crusader, which lasted fom December 2012 to December 2017. In 2020 a new card game was launched to coincide with Digimon Adventure:'' using a new system, this was released in the West in January 2021.

References

External links

 
 , outside-of-Asia series 

 
Video game franchises introduced in 1997
Works set in computers
Bandai brands
Bandai Namco Entertainment franchises
Boys' toys and games
Fictional shapeshifters
Mass media franchises
Video game franchises
Virtual reality in fiction
Television series about parallel universes
Mythopoeia
Portal fantasy